Manilkara chicle is a tropical evergreen tree native to Mexico and Central America.  The tree ranges from Veracruz in Mexico south to Atlántico in Colombia. It yields a natural gum known as chicle, traditionally used in making chewing gum and other products.

See also
 Manilkara zapota, the sapodilla tree

References

External links

chicle
Plants described in 1919
Trees of Oaxaca
Trees of Puebla
Trees of Veracruz
Trees of Chiapas